The 2010 Eastern Illinois Panthers football team represented Eastern Illinois University as a member of the Ohio Valley Conference (OVC) during  the 2010 NCAA Division I FCS football season. Led by 23rd-year head coach Bob Spoo, the Panthers compiled an overall record of 2–9 with a mark of 2–6 in conference play, placing seventh in the OVC. Eastern Illinois played home games at O'Brien Field in Charleston, Illinois.

Schedule

References

Eastern Illinois
Eastern Illinois Panthers football seasons
Eastern Illinois Panthers football